Quantedge Capital is an alternative investment asset manager based in Singapore and New York City. It manages over US$3 billion under its flagship Quantedge Global Fund primarily on behalf of high-net-worth individuals, family offices and institutions.

Firm overview 

Founded in 2006, the firm has roughly 70 employees based in Singapore and New York.

Investment strategy 

Quantedge employs a systematic investment strategy that uses statistical models to pick trades across major macro asset classes such as bonds, equities, commodities, currencies and reinsurance. The fund has an investment universe of more than 200 instruments and typically invests in more than  90% of these instruments with no more than 5% allocation to a single instrument. Hence, the portfolio is exceedingly diversified as the manager believes that "ultra-diversification" helps to enhance the overall portfolio's risk-adjusted returns. It also uses dynamic asset allocation to overweight more attractive instruments and underweight less attractive ones. Quantedge also targets a constant level of total risk, which approximates to 25% in annualized terms and it does not employ short-term day-trading strategies; holding on to its positions ranging from weeks to several years.

Investment returns 

Since its launch in October 2006, the firm's Quantedge Global Fund has averaged more than +20% annual returns after fees. The fund has delivered positive returns for most years since inception, except in 2008 (-22.6%), 2015 (-18.3%) and 2018 (-29%). Its largest annual gain was in 2010 with an 82% return. The consistent outsize returns set the firm apart in the hedge-fund industry. Hedge funds globally have produced an average annualized return of 3.6% as of the end of June 2016 while similar quantitative funds have produced an average annualized return of 5% over the same period, according to data provided by fund tracker HFR Inc.

Source: Bloomberg . 2006 returns are since October.

The fund's track record makes it one of the most successful hedge funds as ranked by AsiaHedge, Bloomberg, Barrons, HSBC and Stega Capital amongst others. Other notable hedge funds with similar outstanding long-term performance in the past include the Medallion Fund by Renaissance Technologies and George Soros' Quantum Fund which are both closed to outside investors and have been since the 1990s and early 2000s respectively.

Criticism

High target volatility 
Quantedge targets a high level of total risk for its portfolio relative to other hedge funds. As a result, the fund expects to experience a 10% to over 40% loss periodically as part of its strategy. During the 2008 financial crisis, Quantedge experienced a 45% maximum drawdown or loss before ending the year with a narrower 22% loss. In March 2020, Quantedge experienced its largest monthly decline of 28%. Hence, the fund only accepts investors who understand its strategy, are able to tolerate high levels of short-term volatility and who can invest for the long term.

Multi-year lock-ups 
Since February 2018, new investors are only offered investments in the 3-year or 5-year fixed-term share classes. More than 85% of their assets under management committed for three years or longer.

References

Hedge funds
Hedge fund firms in New York City
Financial services companies established in 2006